Second sound is a quantum mechanical phenomenon in which heat transfer occurs by wave-like motion, rather than by the more usual mechanism of diffusion. Its presence leads to a very high thermal conductivity. It is known as "second sound" because the wave motion of entropy and temperature is similar to the propagation of pressure waves in air (sound). The phenomenon of second sound was first described by Lev Landau in 1941.

Normal sound waves are fluctuations in the displacement and density of molecules in a substance;
second sound waves are fluctuations in the density of particle-like thermal excitations (rotons and phonons).
Second sound can be observed in any system in which most phonon-phonon collisions conserve momentum, like superfluids and in some dielectric crystals when Umklapp scattering is small.
(Umklapp phonon-phonon scattering exchanges momentum with the crystal lattice, so phonon momentum is not conserved.)

In helium II
Second sound is observed in liquid helium at temperatures below the lambda point, 2.1768 K, where 4He becomes a superfluid known as helium II.
Helium II has the highest thermal conductivity of any known material (several hundred times higher than copper). Second sound can be observed either as pulses or in a resonant cavity.

The speed of second sound is close to zero near the lambda point, increasing to approximately 20 m/s around 1.8 K, about ten times slower than normal sound waves.
At temperatures below 1 K, the speed of second sound in helium II increases as the temperature decreases.

Second sound is also observed in superfluid helium-3 below its lambda point 2.5 mK.

As per the two-fluid, the speed of the second speed is given by

In other media

Second sound has been observed in solid 4He and 3He,
and in some dielectric solids such as Bi in the temperature
range of 1.2 to 4.0 K with a velocity of 780 ± 50 m/s,
or NaF around 10 to 20 K.

In 2019 it was reported that ordinary graphite exhibits "second sound" at 120 K. This feature was both predicted theoretically and observed experimentally, and
was by far the highest temperature at which second sound has been observed. However, this second sound is observed only at the microscale, because the wave dies out exponentially with
characteristic length 1-10 microns. Therefore, presumably graphite in the right temperature regime has extraordinarily high thermal conductivity but only for the purpose of transferring heat pulses distances of order 10 microns, and for pulses of duration on the order of 10 nanoseconds. For more "normal" heat-transfer, graphite's observed thermal conductivity is less than that of, e.g, copper. The theoretical models, however, predict longer absorption lengths would be seen in isotopically-pure graphite, and perhaps over a wider temperature range, e.g. even at room temperature. (As of March 2019, that experiment has not yet been tried.)

In 2021 this effect was observed in a BKT superfluid as well as in a germanium semiconductor

Applications

Measuring the speed of second sound in 3He-4He mixtures can be
used as a thermometer in the range 0.01-0.7 K.

Oscillating superleak transducers (OST) use second sound to locate defects in superconducting accelerator cavities.

See also
Third sound

References

Bibliography 
 Sinyan Shen, Surface Second Sound in Superfluid Helium. PhD Dissertation (1973).  http://adsabs.harvard.edu/abs/1973PhDT.......142S
 V. Peshkov, "'Second Sound' in Helium II," J. Phys. (Moscow) 8, 381 (1944)
 U. Piram, "Numerical investigation of second sound in liquid helium," Dipl.-Ing. Dissertation (1991).  Retrieved on April 15, 2007.

Quantum mechanics
Thermodynamics
Superfluidity
Lev Landau